Rowing at the 2018 Summer Youth Olympics was held from 7 to 10 October. The events took place at the Puerto Madero in Buenos Aires, Argentina, being raced over a 500 metre 4 lane course, under the Puente de la Mujer. Racing started with a time trial (out, round a buoy, and back) to allocate crews to heats.  There were two rounds of heats with crews being awarded points based on their ranking in each heat and the accumulated points from the two heats determining progression to the quarter-finals of the singles and semi-finals of the pairs.

Qualification

Six qualification events were held to determine the representation for the 2018 Youth Olympics, the 2017 World Junior Championships and five continental qualifiers. Each National Olympic Committee (NOC) can enter a maximum of 2 boats, 1 per each gender. Should Argentina not qualify any boats they would be given a boat in single sculls for each gender. As Argentina qualified two boats the host quota was reallocated to the American Qualification Regatta. In addition four athlete quotas, two from each gender will be decided by the Tripartite Commission.

To be eligible to participate at the Youth Olympics athletes must have been born between 1 January 2000 and 31 December 2001. Should a NOC qualify two boats from the same gender the boat with the higher ranking will be qualified and the next highest ranked NOC will qualify.

Single Sculls

Pairs

Medal summary

Medal table

Boys

Girls

Final Results

Male - Single Sculls

Female - Single Sculls

Male - Double Sculls

Female - Double Sculls

References

External links

Official Results Book – Rowing

 
2018 Summer Youth Olympics events
Youth Summer Olympics
2018
Rowing competitions in Argentina